Released for Windows, OS X, and PlayStation 4 on November 3, 2015, and PlayStation Vita and Wii U on August 18, 2016, Poncho (stylized as PONCHO) is an action game developed by Delve Interactive.

Gameplay
The game consists of a robot wearing a poncho. Humanity has disappeared and only robots remain. Players make their mission through the world of pixelated parallax to find Poncho's maker and save humanity. The gameplay consists of a 2D platformer with different layer of depth, being able to get closer or further away.

Reception
The PC version has been reviewed on Destructoid with a score of 60/100. The PS4 version has been reviewed on Hardcore Gamer with a score of 80/100. On PSU.com, also for the PS4 version, the game was reviewed with a score of 80/100. On GameCrate, the game's review score was 78/100. On Push Square, the review score was 50/100. Hardcore Gamer compared the game to Fez.

The game was a commercial failure.  In a blog post at Gamasutra published over a year after the game's release, Dan Hayes, a developer at Delve stated their company had "not yet made a single penny from Poncho".  He further blamed Rising Star Games for a lack of support; the publisher responded by stating that Delve had consistently missed milestones.

References

2015 video games
Action video games
MacOS games
PlayStation 4 games
PlayStation Vita games
Video games developed in the United Kingdom
Wii U games
Windows games
Rising Star Games games
Single-player video games